Essau Boxer Kanyenda (born 27 September 1982) is a former Malawian international footballer who played as a striker.

Career
Kanyenda started his career in 1998 in Malawi's First Division for FC Welfare in Dwangwa. He was spotted by Jomo Sono the owner of Jomo Cosmos FC during the Cosafa under 17 in 1999. He has been with Jomo Cosmos under 17 alongside Peter Mponda, in two tours in Italy where he played several games and become second top goalscorer in both occasions. He then turned professional and played in the Premier League of Malawi from 1999–2001 for FC Dwasco (Nkhota-Kota), before moving to South Africa to play in its Premier League, with Jomo Cosmos in Johannesburg between 2001 and 2003.

In 2003, Kanyenda moved to Russia, for FC Rostov in Russia's Premier League. In 2005, he left briefly for FC Lokomotiv Moscow after being the third top goal scorer in Russian top league, but re-joined FC Rostov on loan until December 2007. After two years with FC Lokomotiv Moscow joined in January 2008 to FC KAMAZ Naberezhnye Chelny. He was their top goalscorer in that season. Kanyenda has played for Rotor Volgograd (loan) Dynamo Bryansk (loan)

In spring 2012 he was persuaded to join the Danish side B93 by the former Malawi national football team manager Kim Splidsboel.

In September 2012, he signed a contract with the South African side Polokwane City.

He lives in Manchester with family.

International
Kanyenda is also a member of the Malawi national football team, beginning his international career on 12 March 2000 against Zambia.

International goals

Early life
Born as Esau Boxer Kanyenda, to Binwell Boxer Kanyenda and Florence Phiri. Born in a family of seven. five boys and two girls. He lost his mother in April 1994 and his elder brother in September 2003. His father is retired accountant in Malawi government (In Dwangwa) Kanyenda used to play the street football with his friends.

UEFA Champions League qualifying campaign
The Malawian will be the first Malawian football player to play in UEFA Champions League as far as Malawian football is concern.

Russian title-holders FC Lokomotiv Moskva have signed Malawi striker Esau Kanyenda from FC Rostov ahead of their UEFA Champions League qualifying campaign.

Rostov commitments
Kanyenda will join Lokomotiv on a five-year contract after playing in Rostov's next three league games. The 22-year-old has been with the Premier-Liga team since 2003, having also scored 26 goals in 46 appearances for South African side Jomo Cosmos.

Vital goals
He has found the target twenty six times in 62 matches for Rostov and helped the club reach the Russian Cup final in 2003. However, Kanyenda has registered only seventh this season, although those goals brought second-from-bottom Rostov their first points of the campaign against FC Shinnik Yaroslavl and FC Rubin Kazan.

Russia Sochi 2014 Winter Olympics bid
In 2006, Kanyenda was recognised as the first ever African ambassador to represent the Russian Black Sea resort city of Sochi's bid to host the 2014 Winter Olympics bid. The Malawians have never produce the good striker like Kanyenda. He is well known in Russia as well as in South Africa as Black Mamba
In 2002, Kanyenda went for the trials with French top side Marseille, Monday, 20 January 2003
Kanyenda scored five goals in five trial matches
Malawi striker Essau Kanyenda has signed for French side Marseille on a six-month loan deal.
The young forward won a deal after making a great impact while on trial from South African side Jomo Cosmos.

"They were very impressed with my performance and offered to sign me on loan with an option to buy," Kanyenda confirmed to the Malawian newspaper The Nation.

"The head coach said my performance throughout the trials was beyond his realistic expectations and that I reminded him of former Liberian star George Weah."

Kanyenda added that he had been delighted at the news and signed straight away.

"I didn't have to think twice after taking a look at the copy of the contract," he said.

"It is an appetising contract though I would have loved it if they had bought me outright."

At Marseille, Kanyenda will link up with fellow African striker, Ivory Coast's Ibrahim Bakayoko.

He became the second Malawian to play in the French league, after Ernest Mtawali, who was once with Toulouse.
Unluckily the deal was flop because of technical reasons, he said on Cosmos website.

References

External links
 
 Stats at FIFA.com

1982 births
Living people
People from Dedza District
Malawian footballers
FC Rostov players
FC KAMAZ Naberezhnye Chelny players
FC Lokomotiv Moscow players
Malawian expatriate footballers
Malawian expatriate sportspeople in South Africa
Malawi international footballers
2010 Africa Cup of Nations players
Association football forwards
Jomo Cosmos F.C. players
Expatriate soccer players in South Africa
Expatriate footballers in Russia
Russian Premier League players
FC Rotor Volgograd players
Polokwane City F.C. players
FC Dynamo Bryansk players